Who's Your New Professor is an album by Sam Prekop.

Track listing
 "Something" – 3:49
 "Magic Step" – 2:41
 "Dot Eye" – 4:37
 "Two Dedications" – 4:28
 "Chicago People" – 2:44
 "Little Bridges" – 3:00
 "A Splendid Hollow" – 2:39
 "C + F" – 4:32
 "Neighbor to Neighbor" – 1:35
 "Density" – 4:51
 "Between Outside" - 2:47

Credits 
Bass (Acoustic & Electric) & Piano (Acoustic & Electric): Joshua Abrams
Cornet: Rob Mazurek
Drums: Chad Taylor
Guitar & Piano: Archer Prewitt
Mixed By: John McEntire
Vocals, Guitar & Piano: Sam Prekop

References

Sam Prekop albums
2005 albums
Thrill Jockey albums